Ndengereko, also known as Rufiji (Fiji, Ruihi) after the local river, is a Bantu language of the Matumbi hills, near Kibiti, and near Mchukivi and Bungu, Tanzania.

References 

Rufiji-Ruvuma languages
Languages of Tanzania